The Book of Life is a 2014 American  3D computer-animated musical fantasy comedy film produced by 20th Century Fox Animation, Reel FX Animation Studios, and Chatrone, and distributed by 20th Century Fox. Co-written and directed by Jorge R. Gutierrez, it was produced by Guillermo del Toro, Brad Booker, Aaron D. Berger, and Carina Schulze. It features the voices of Diego Luna, Zoe Saldana, and Channing Tatum with supporting roles by Christina Applegate, Ice Cube, Ron Perlman, and Kate del Castillo. Based on an original idea by Gutierrez, the story follows a bullfighter who, on the Day of the Dead, embarks on an afterlife adventure to fulfill the expectations of his family and friends.

The Book of Life premiered in Los Angeles on October 12, 2014, and was released theatrically in the United States on October 17, 2014. It received mostly positive reviews from critics and a Golden Globe nomination for Best Animated Feature Film. The film grossed $100 million on a $50 million budget.

Plot

Mary Beth, a museum tour guide, takes a group of school detention students on a secret museum tour, telling them the story of a Mexican town called San Angel from the Book of Life, a mythical book that holds every story in the world.

On the Day of the Dead, La Muerte, the ruler of the Land of the Remembered, and Xibalba, ruler of the Land of the Forgotten, see two young boys named Manolo Sánchez and Joaquín Mondragon competing for the love of their friend María Posada. They strike a wager: if María marries Manolo, Xibalba will no longer interfere in mortal affairs, but if she marries Joaquín, La Muerte and Xibalba will swap realms. That same night, Xibalba secretly cheats by giving Joaquín his Medal of Everlasting Life, which grants the wearer invincibility.

María's father, General Posada, sends María to Spain to become a "lady" after she frees pigs destined for slaughter. Years later, the day María returns to San Angel, Joaquín has become a military hero with the Medal's aid. Manolo dreams of becoming a musician but his aspirations are suppressed by his father Carlos, who trains him to be a bullfighter, as it is a Sanchez family tradition.

At Manolo's first bullfight, he defeats the bull but refuses to kill it, angering his father and the crowd but impressing María. That night, María is pressured by her father to marry Joaquín so he can protect San Angel from the Bandit King Chakal. María and Manolo profess their mutual love before dawn but are interrupted when Xibalba sends his dual-headed snake staff, which bites her and sends her into a coma. When Manolo brings Maria's body to the town, Joaquín and Ramiro angrily blames him for her death. Devastated by María's death, Manolo allows Xibalba to kill him, believing that he will be reunited with María in the Land of the Remembered, where souls go after death and stay as long as they are remembered by their family and friends that live on.

In the Land of the Remembered, Manolo reunites with his mother and his ancestors. They travel to La Muerte's castle to look for María but discover Xibalba, who is now the ruler of the realm because he won the wager. He smugly reveals to Manolo that María did not die because she was only bitten once by his snake and therefore survived, while Manolo was bitten twice and died. Furious but determined to return to María, Manolo travels to the Cave of Souls to consult La Muerte.

Inside, he meets the Candle Maker, the overseer of mortal lives and keeper of the Book of Life. The Candle Maker sees that Manolo's story in the Book of Life is blank because he has not been writing the story that has been written for him. He takes them to the Land of the Forgotten, where they find La Muerte at Xibalba's castle and expose his cheating. Furious, La Muerte lectures Xibalba before offering a new wager at Manolo's request: Manolo's life will be returned if he completes a challenge of Xibalba's choosing, but if he fails, he will be forgotten and Xibalba will keep both realms. Xibalba sets Manolo against a giant bull skeleton made from the skeletons of every bull slain by the Sanchez family and challenges him to defeat it.

Meanwhile, María awakens from her coma, learns of Manolo's death, and reluctantly accepts Joaquín's proposal. Joaquin notices María's misery, and begins to reconsider, but their wedding is interrupted by Chakal and his army to retrieve the Medal, which had once been in his possession. Chakal kills Carlos, who arrives in the Land of the Remembered in time to see Manolo's fight. Manolo, realizing his fear is actually of being himself, refuses to fight and instead sings an apology to the bull, appeasing it and touching the hearts of everyone present (including Xibalba and Carlos).

Impressed, the deities resurrect Manolo and send him and his family to San Angel to protect the town. Manolo is knocked unconscious when Chakal destructs himself, but he is protected by the Medal, which Joaquín had slipped him earlier. Joaquín returns the medal to Xibalba and resolves to be a true hero, while Manolo and María are happily married, and Xibalba and La Muerte reconcile.

In the present, Mary Beth finishes the story, and the amazed children leave the museum. Mary Beth and a museum security guard then reveal themselves to be La Muerte and Xibalba in disguise. The Candle Maker then appears and encourages the audience to write their own story.

Voice cast

 Diego Luna as Manolo Sánchez, a torero with a guitar and two swords, and the youngest in a family of skilled bullfighters.
 Emil-Bastien Bouffard as a young Manolo.
 Joe Matthews as young Manolo's singing voice.
 Zoe Saldana as María Posada, Manolo and Joaquín's best friend and love interest. She is also General Ramiro Posada's daughter.
 Genesis Ochoa as a young María
 Channing Tatum as Joaquín Mondragon Jr., a young man who is Manolo's closest friend and the town hero of San Angel.
 Elias Garza as a young Joaquín
 Ice Cube as the Candle Maker, a being who oversees the lives and stories of the living through candles and the Book of Life, which he also oversees.
 Ron Perlman as Xibalba, the ruler of the Land of the Forgotten and La Muerte's husband.
 Kate del Castillo as La Muerte, the ruler of the Land of the Remembered and Xibalba's wife.
 Christina Applegate as Mary Beth, a museum tour guide, the story's narrator and one of La Muerte's disguises.
 Tonita Castro as La Muerte disguised as an old woman.
 Héctor Elizondo as Carlos Sánchez, Manolo's well-meaning yet extremely harsh father.
 Ana de la Reguera as Carmen Sánchez, Manolo's deceased mother. She was credited as "Skeleton Carmen".
 Danny Trejo as Luis Sánchez, Manolo's deceased grandfather. He was credited as "Skeleton Luis".
 Grey Griffin as Grandma Anita Sanchez, Manolo's short great-grandmother who later dies due to cholesterol problems.
 Carlos Alazraqui as:
 General Ramiro Posada, Maria's father who serves as the mayor of San Angel and the general of its army.
 Dali, a member of San Angel's army.
 Chuy, María's loyal pig pet who thinks that he is a goat.
 Plácido Domingo as Jorge Sánchez, Manolo's deceased granduncle who wears an eyepatch over his left eye and swords on his right arm and left leg that can sing opera songs. He was credited as "Skeleton Jorge".
 Jorge R. Gutierrez as Carmelo Sánchez, Manolo's deceased tall and burly Aztec ancestor who is often called as savage by Jorge. He was credited as "Skeleton Carmelo".
 Gabriel Iglesias as Pepe Rodríguez, the largest of the three musicians.
 Cheech Marin as Pancho Rodríguez, the medium-sized of the Three musicians.
 Ricardo Sánchez as Pablo Rodriguez, the shortest of the three musicians.
 Dan Navarro as Chakal, the Bandit King.
 Eugenio Derbez as Chato, a member and second of Chakal's group of bandits.
 Anjelah Johnson as Adelita, one of Manolo's deceased cousins and Scardelita's twin sister. She perished during the Mexican Revolution while protecting Emiliano Zapata.
 Sandra Equihua as Scardelita, one of Manolo's deceased cousins and Adelita's twin sister who wears an eyepatch. She perished during the Mexican Revolution while protecting Emiliano Zapata.
 Miguel Sandoval as the Land of the Remembered Captain, the guide to the Land of the Remembered and the resident that Manolo meets first.
 Angélica María Hartman Ortiz as Sister Ana, a Catholic sister who works in San Angel's church.
 Sandra Echeverría as Claudia, a beautiful woman at San Angel and one of Joaquín's biggest fans.
 Trey Bumpass as:
 Luka Ramirez, a Mexican-American goth boy and one of the detention students in the present world who listens to Manolo's story from Mary Beth. He was credited as "Goth Kid".
 An orphan in San Angel
 Kennedy "KK" Peil as Sasha, a little Russian-American girl and one of the detention students in the present world who listens to Manolo's story from Mary Beth.
 Ishan Sharma as Sanjay, an Indian-American boy and one of the detention students in the present world who listens to Manolo's story from Mary Beth.
 Callahan Clark as Jane, a Chinese-American girl and one of the detention students in the present world who listens to Manolo's story from Mary Beth.
 Eric Bauza as
 Father Domingo, a priest that works in San Angel's church.
 Cave Guardian, the guardian of the Cave of Souls.
 Aron Warner as Thomas, a male museum tour guide.
 Troy Evans as Old Man Hemingway, an old man who lived at San Angel.
 Guillermo del Toro as the Land of the Remembered Captain's Wife, the unnamed wife of the Land of Remembered Captain who died of a broken heart.
 Brad Booker as a train conductor

Production

Jorge R. Gutierrez first began developing The Book of Life fourteen years before its release. Several of the film's story ideas originated in Gutierrez's 2000 student film Carmelo. The opportunity to have The Book of Life produced as a feature film arrived after Gutierrez and his wife, Sandra Equihua, created the Nickelodeon animated series El Tigre: The Adventures of Manny Rivera.

The Book of Life was originally optioned by DreamWorks Animation in 2007, but never went beyond development because of "creative differences". From there the film went to 20th Century Fox Animation and Reel FX, with 20th Century Fox handling distribution rights. Guillermo del Toro joined as a producer. The film was initially given a release date of October 10, 2014; however, this was eventually moved back by a week. On October 16, 2013, it was announced that Channing Tatum, Zoe Saldana, Diego Luna and Christina Applegate would star as voice actors in the film.

Gutierrez wanted to make the final animation look like the concept artwork saying: "I saw every single one that comes out and my biggest heartbreak is that I see all this glorious art, and then the movie doesn't look like that! The mandate of this movie was: Our 'Art of' book is going to look exactly like the movie. And every artist poured their heart and soul into that idea." Gutierrez did not permit his animation team to go on any research trips to Mexico, feeling that such trips often only covered very touristy aspects of the culture. Instead he had the team address any questions they had about the region to him. He also stated that research trips would not be necessary to portray the film's "magic version of Mexico". Explaining that the tone of the film as initially conceived was going to be much darker, Gutierrez said, "I always felt, much like the design, I need to push the envelope so that when I pull back, I end up with something I love."

Release
The Book of Life made its world premiere in Los Angeles on October 12, 2014. It was released on October 17, 2014 in North America.

Home media
The Book of Life was released on DVD, Blu-ray and Blu-ray 3D on January 27, 2015 by 20th Century Fox Home Entertainment. The special features included a 3-minute short animated film, titled The Adventures of Chuy. The film currently streams on Disney+ as of February 2021.

Music

In April 2013, it was announced Gustavo Santaolalla and Paul Williams would be adapting pop songs for the film. The soundtrack was released on September 26, 2014, while the score was released on October 24, 2014.

Reception

Box office
The Book of Life grossed $50.2 million in North America and $49.8 million in other countries for a worldwide total of $100 million, against a production budget of $50 million.

The Book of Life was released in the United States and Canada on October 17, 2014. The film earned $300,000 from Thursday late night showings from 2,150 theatres and $4.9 million on its opening day. The film debuted at number three in its opening weekend earning $17 million at an average of $5,537 per theatre behind Fury ($23.5 million) and Gone Girl ($17.8 million). The film played 57% female and 54% under the age of 25 years. It played 59% under 10-years old while 31% of tickets sold were in 3D.

In other territories, The Book of Life earned $8.58 million from 3,654 screens in 19 markets. The highest debuts came from Mexico ($3.84 million) and Brazil ($1.98 million). In Mexico, the film was number two behind the local film Perfect Dictatorship.

Critical reception
On Rotten Tomatoes, the film has an approval rating of 83% based on 127 reviews and an average rating of 6.90/10. The site's critical consensus reads "The Book of Lifes gorgeous animation is a treat, but it's a pity that its story lacks the same level of craft and detail that its thrilling visuals provide." On Metacritic, the film has a weighted average score of 67 out of 100 based on reviews from 27 critics, indicating "generally favorable reviews". Audiences polled by CinemaScore gave the film an average grade of "A−" on an A+ to F scale.

Geoff Berkshire of Variety wrote, "Repping a major step forward for Dallas-based Reel FX Animation Studios (after their anemic feature bow on last year's Free Birds), the beautifully rendered CG animation brings an unusually warm and heartfelt quality to the high-tech medium and emerges as the film's true calling card." Frank Scheck of The Hollywood Reporter wrote, "The Book of Life is a visually stunning effort that makes up for its formulaic storyline with an enchanting atmosphere that sweeps you into its fantastical world, or in this case, three worlds." Simon Abrams of The Village Voice wrote that the film's "hackneyed stock plot preaches tolerance while lamely reinforcing the status quo". Marc Snetiker of Entertainment Weekly gave the film an A−, saying "Overflowing with hyperactive charm and a spectacular sea of colors, it showcases some of the most breathtaking animation we've seen this decade." Claudia Puig of USA Today gave the film two and a half stars out of four, saying "The dizzying, intricate imagery is so beautiful, and the Latin-inspired songs catchy enough that the overall effect is often enchanting." Sara Stewart of The New York Post gave the film two out of four stars, saying "Just in time for Mexico's Day of the Dead holiday comes this gloriously colorful animated musical, which almost (but not quite) makes up in visuals what it lacks in snappy dialogue." Katie Rife of The A.V. Club gave the film a B−, saying "Ultimately, what drags The Book Of Life down is its insistence on trying to update an (original) folkloric story for a contemporary audience. In practice, this means adding some pop-cultural touches that only serve to take the viewer out of the fantastic setting."

Michael Ordoña of the San Francisco Chronicle gave the film three out of five stars, saying "The vibrant animated feature The Book of Life is a cheeky celebration of Mexican folklore with a solid cast, an irreverent sensibility and gorgeous visuals." Michael O'Sullivan of The Washington Post gave the film three out of five stars, saying "The Book of Life may use state-of-the-art animation, but it derives its strength from the wisdom of antiquity. It only looks new, but it's as old as life (and death) itself. Bill Goodykoontz of The Arizona Republic gave the film four out of five stars, saying "A visually stunning, funny movie that trusts children to deal with subject matter that many films don't: specifically, death." Frank Lovece of Newsday gave the film three out of four stars, saying "Funny without being frantic, seamlessly switching from dry humor to slapstick, it shows death as a part of life -- and, judging from a preview audience of very young tykes, does so in a gentle, delightful way." Manohla Dargis of The New York Times gave the film a negative review, saying "This often beautiful and too-often moribund, if exhaustingly frenetic, feature tends to be less energetic than the dead people waltzing through it." Conversely, Charles Solomon of the Los Angeles Times gave wrote, "The Book of Life juxtaposes overwrought visual imagery with an undernourished, familiar story - regrettable flaws in one of the few animated films to focus on Latino characters and the rich heritage of Mexican folk culture." Marjorie Baumgarten of The Austin Chronicle gave the film two and a half stars out of five, saying "Visually arresting but dramatically rote, The Book of Life at least introduces American kids to the Mexican holiday of Día de los Muertos and should score points with families looking for kid-friendly movies that reflect aspects of their Mexican cultural heritage."

Calvin Wilson of the St. Louis Post-Dispatch gave the film two and a half stars out of five, saying "The Book of Life is a flawed but intriguing new chapter in animation." James Berardinelli of ReelViews gave the film three out of four stars, saying "The Book of Life moves breezily from one scene to the next, keeping the pace brisk and rarely skipping a beat." Laura Emerick of the Chicago Sun-Times gave the film three out of four stars, saying "Whether en ingles o en espanol, The Book of Life is a delight. In an animated universe cluttered with kung-fu pandas, ice princesses and video-game heroes, Gutierrez and del Toro have conjured up an original vision." Tasha Robinson of The Dissolve gave the film three and a half stars out of five, saying "It's all flawed, and distracted, and conceptually messy, prioritizing color over common sense and energy over consistency. But as an afternoon's diversion for a handful of misbehaving kids—both within the movie, and within the movie theater—it's authentically winning." Michael Ordona of the San Francisco Chronicle wrote, "There are no great surprises, no shocking reveals (except to the characters themselves). But there's so much to appreciate along the way that it's a real page-turner." Kenji Fujishima of Slant Magazine gave the film two out of four stars, saying "Jorge R. Gutierrez subsumes the film's darker themes in a relentlessly busy farrago of predictable kids'-movie tropes and annoying attempts at hipness." Ben Sachs of the Chicago Reader called it ""more imaginative than most" but said it is "undone by a surfeit of glib one-liners and pop culture references".

Accolades
{| class="wikitable plainrowheaders"
|+ <span style="font-size: 9pt">List of Awards and Nominations</span>
|-
! scope="col" style="width:25%;"| Award
! scope="col" style="width:33%;"| Category
! scope="col" style="width:33%;"| Recipients
! scope="col" style="width:5%;"| Results
! scope="col" style="width:4%;"| 
|-
! scope="row" rowspan="5" style="text-align:center;"| 42nd Annual Annie Awards
|Best Animated Feature
|The Book of Life|
| scope="row" rowspan="5" style="text-align:center;"|
|-
|Animated Effects in an Animated Production
|Augusto Schillaci, Erich Turner, Bill Konersman, Chris Rasch, Joseph Burnette
|
|-
|Character Design in an Animated Feature Production
|Paul Sullivan, Sandra Equihua, Jorge R. Gutierrez
|
|-
|Directing in an Animated Feature Production
|Jorge R. Gutierrez
|
|-
|Production Design in an Animated Feature Production
|Simon Varela & Paul Sullivan
|
|-
! scope="row" rowspan="3" style="text-align:center;"| 4th Behind the Voice Actors Awards
| Best Female Lead Vocal Performance in a Feature Film
| Zoe Saldana
| 
| scope="row" rowspan="3" style="text-align:center;"| 
|-
| Best Male Vocal Performance in a Feature Film in a Supporting Role
| Ron Perlman
| 
|-
| Best Female Vocal Performance in a Feature Film in a Supporting Role
| Kate del Castillo
| 
|-
! scope="row" style="text-align:center;"| 15th Black Reel Awards
| Outstanding Voice Performance
| Zoe Saldana
| 
| scope="row" style="text-align:center;"| 
|-
! scope="row" style="text-align:center;"| 30th Casting Society of America Awards
| Outstanding Achievement in Casting - Animation Feature
| Christian Kaplan
| 
| scope="row" style="text-align:center;"| 
|-
! scope="row" style="text-align:center;"| 13th Central Ohio Film Critics Association Awards
| Best Animated Film
| rowspan="5"|The Book of Life| 
|scope="row" rowspan="3" style="text-align:center;"| 
|-
! scope="row" style="text-align:center;"| 20th Critics' Choice Awards
| Best Animated Feature
| 
|-
! scope="row" style="text-align:center;"| 4th Georgia Film Critics Association Awards
| Best Animated Film
| 
|-
! scope="row" rowspan="1" style="text-align:center;"| 72nd Golden Globe Awards
|Best Animated Feature Film
|
| scope="row" style="text-align:center;" |
|-
! scope="row" style="text-align:center;"| 14th Golden Schmoes Awards
| Best Animated Movie of the Year
| 
| scope="row" style="text-align:center;"|
|-
! scope="row" rowspan="2" style="text-align:center;"| Hollywood Music in Media Awards
| Best Original Score - Animated Film
| Gustavo Santaolalla
| 
| scope="row" rowspan="2" style="text-align:center;"| 
|-
| Outstanding Music Supervision - Film
| John Houlihan
| 
|-
! scope="row" style="text-align:center;"| 8th Houston Film Critics Society Awards
| Best Animated Film
| rowspan="3" | The Book of Life| 
| scope="row" style="text-align:center;"| 
|-
! scope="row" style="text-align:center;"| 6th International 3D & Advanced Imaging Society Awards
| 3D Feature - Animated
| 
| scope="row" style="text-align:center;"| 
|-
! scope="row" style="text-align:center;"| 62nd MPSE Golden Reel Awards
| Best Sound Editing - Animated Feature
| 
| scope="row" style="text-align:center;"| 
|-
! scope="row" style="text-align:center;"| 46th NAACP Image Awards
| Outstanding Character Voice-Over Performance
| Zoe Saldana
| 
| scope="row" style="text-align:center;"| 
|-
! scope="row" rowspan="1" style="text-align:center;"| 26th Producers Guild of America Awards
| Best Outstanding Producer of Animated Theatrical Motion Pictures
| Guillermo del Toro and Brad Booker
| 
| scope="row" style="text-align:center;" |
|-
! scope="row" style="text-align:center;"| 19th Satellite Awards
| Satellite Award for Best Animated or Mixed Media Feature
| rowspan="2" | The Book of Life| 
| scope="row" style="text-align:center;"| 
|-
! scope="row" style="text-align:center;"| 11th St. Louis Film Critics Association Awards
| Best Animated Film
| 
| scope="row" style="text-align:center;"| 
|-
! scope="row" style="text-align:center;"| 13th Visual Effects Society Awards
| Outstanding Created Environment in an Animated Feature Motion Picture
| "Magical Land of the Remembered"Glo Minaya, Amy Chen, Sean McEwan, Jeff Masters
| 
| scope="row" style="text-align:center;"| 
|-
! scope="row" style="text-align:center;"| 13th Washington D.C. Area Film Critics Association Awards
| Best Animated Feature
| The Book of Life| 
| scope="row" style="text-align:center;"| 
|}

Future
Director Jorge Gutierrez revealed in an interview that one of the ideas for the next chapter in the story involves Joaquin and his relationship with his father. "I had always imagined the first movie to be about Manolo, the second to be about Joaquín and the third one to be about Maria...I've always conceived it as a trilogy." In June 2017, Gutierrez and Reel FX Animation announced that development on the sequel had begun; however, as of June 2019, Gutierrez clarified on Twitter that there are currently no plans for a sequel.

See also
 Coco'', a 2017 animated film also featuring a Mexican-style realm of the dead.

References

External links

 
 
 
 

2014 films
2014 3D films
2014 computer-animated films
2010s children's animated films
2010s children's comedy films
2010s children's fantasy films
2010s adventure comedy films
2010s American animated films
2010s fantasy comedy films
2010s musical films
20th Century Fox animated films
20th Century Fox Animation films
20th Century Fox films
American 3D films
American adventure comedy films
American children's animated adventure films
American children's animated comedy films
American children's animated fantasy films
American children's animated musical films
American computer-animated films
American fantasy adventure films
American fantasy comedy films
American animated feature films
Annie Award winners
Day of the Dead films
Films about the afterlife
Films directed by Jorge R. Gutierrez
Films produced by Guillermo del Toro
Films set in Mexico
Mexican culture
Reel FX Creative Studios films
Jukebox musical films
Films scored by Gustavo Santaolalla
3D animated films
2014 directorial debut films
2014 comedy films
2010s English-language films